Nicolai Frahm (born 1975) is a London-based Danish art advisor, exhibition producer, collector, and the co-founder of Frahm & Frahm and Dairy Art Centre, a contemporary art gallery in London which closed in 2014.

Early life
Nicolai Frahm was born in 1975, and grew up in Copenhagen in a family collecting and showing post-war European art to the public at their private art foundation. His father Flemming Frahm was a businessman and art collector.

Career
He started his career at Sotheby's and Christie's in London before opening his own firm in London and Basel in 1997. Frahm and his brother Michael Frahm later founded Frahm & Frahm - a company specialising in producing institutional exhibitions, creating collaborations with contemporary artists, and building private art collections. The Frahm brothers have collaborated with artist and activist Ai Weiwei.

Frahm's own collection draws on post-war European abstract art, as well as art from the late 1970s to the present, and incorporates both emerging and established artists from America, Europe and Asia. According to Frahm, his collection includes artists such as Cindy Sherman, Richard Prince, Ai Weiwei, Julian Schnabel, Yoshitomo Nara, Takashi Murakami, Zeng Fanzhi and Sigmar Polke.

Frahm was interviewed by the CNN regarding the art market and featured in a How To Spend It article in The Financial Times.

In April 2013, together with fellow art collector Frank Cohen, Frahm opened the Dairy Art Centre, a contemporary art gallery in Bloomsbury. Open to the public, the gallery also offered education and internship training programmes and was available to hire as a venue space. 
Its exhibition programme included solo-shows by John Armleder, Julian Schnabel, and Yoshitomo Nara. The Dairy Art Centre ceased its activities in December 2014.

In 2013, Frahm was cited in the Evening Standard as being among the 1,000 most influential "Imagineers, Artists & curators" in London. He has not featured on the list since 2013.

Personal life
In February 2018, Frahm married model Mariana Herrera in Oaxaca, Mexico, at a 3-day extravagant wedding.

References

External links
Frahm & Frahm website

Danish art collectors
People from Copenhagen
Living people
1975 births
British art collectors
People educated at Herlufsholm School